The first Milton Keynes Dons F.C. manager was Stuart Murdoch, who had previously been manager of Wimbledon. Murdoch only lasted three months into the 2004–05 season before being sacked — his assistant, Jimmy Gilligan, managed the club for a month before Murdoch's replacement was revealed to be Danny Wilson. Wilson managed to keep the team up during the 2004–05 season, but failed to repeat this feat during 2005–06. Following relegation, Wilson was shown the door and replaced with Martin Allen. After Allen's team fell at the play-offs, he left to manage Leicester City. Paul Ince was appointed manager for the 2007–08 season, and proved to be a shrewd appointment as MK Dons won the League Two championship as well as the Football League Trophy. Ince too left after only a season, to become manager of Blackburn Rovers.

Former Chelsea player Roberto di Matteo was then appointed in July 2008, his personal first ever managerial position. Di Matteo was the first, and so far only, foreign manager of the club. He left after a season to manage West Bromwich Albion. Ince was reappointed in his stead on 3 July 2009. Paul Ince resigned as manager on 16 April 2010, stating "a reduction in funds for next season was the reason behind his decision to leave", Karl Robinson was appointed as Caretaker Manager, although Ince remained with the club until the end of the 2009–10 season.

Karl Robinson was appointed manager on 10 May 2010, having previously been the club's assistant manager under previous boss Paul Ince. At 29 years of age, he was the youngest manager in the Football League, and former England coach John Gorman was named his number two. He was also the youngest person to ever acquire a UEFA Pro Licence at the age of 29. At the end of the 2011–12 season Gorman retired and was replaced by former Luton Town player/manager Mick Harford. At the same time, ex-Arsenal and former England international Ian Wright was also enlisted in a part-time role to provide assistance with coaching duties.

In January 2013, Robinson turned down an offer to manage Blackpool, a well established Championship and former Premier League team, in favour of his continuing commitment and loyalty towards Milton Keynes Dons, something which endeared him to the fans of the club. Robinson was linked to other former Premier League clubs including Birmingham City, Sheffield United and Leeds United, and eventually managed Charlton Athletic in 2016–18 after leaving Milton Keynes before moving on to Oxford United.

After Robinson's departure, Richie Barker acted as caretaker manager for just under six weeks before former Hearts manager Robbie Neilson announced his move to the club. Neilson was at the club for just over one year before he left by mutual consent in January 2018 after a disappointing run of one win in 11 league games. Former England youth coach Dan Micciche took over as manager, lasting a spell of three months in the job before leaving, being temporarily replaced by his assistant Keith Millen.

June 2018 saw the appointment of former Exeter City boss Paul Tisdale, tasked with turning around the Dons after their relegation to League Two. Tisdale began his League Two campaign with a near-perfect month, gaining 16 points from a possible 18, conceding just two goals. Tisdale led MK Dons to a third-place finish, gaining automatic promotion back to League One on the first attempt.

Following a poor start to the 2019–20 season in which Milton Keynes Dons achieved only one point from a possible 27 - the worst run of results in the club's short history - Tisdale's contract with the club was mutually terminated on 2 November 2019 following a 1–3 home defeat to Tranmere Rovers. The next day it was announced that MK Dons player Russell Martin would take on the managerial role with immediate effect, and later announced his retirement as a player to focus on the role.

On 1 August 2021, it was announced that Russell Martin had departed Stadiummk, to fill the vacant Head Coach position at EFL Championship outfit Swansea City A.F.C. agreeing terms on a 3 year deal to move to South Wales, with the Buckinghamshire side confirming the news via their website. Dean Lewington took charge temporarily, overseeing the first two league games of the 2021-22 season.

On Friday 13 August 2021, MK Dons announced that former Lommel SK manager Liam Manning had been officially appointed as the Football Club's new Head Coach. Liam guided the Dons to a 3rd place finish in EFL League One that season, losing 2-1 on aggregate to Wycombe Wanderers in the play off semi final.

After only picking up 5 wins from the first 20 league games in the following season, MK Dons parted company with Liam Manning on the 11th December 2022. Dean Lewington again took temporary charge of the team until a new head coach was announced.

On Friday 23 December 2022, Mark Jackson was announced as the new Milton Keynes Dons head coach.

List of managers
Statistics are correct as of 19 January 2023.

Records

Nationalities
As of 30 October 2021 (including caretakers)
  English (12)
  Scottish (3)
  Italian (1)
  Northern Irish (1)

Notes

References

 
Managers
Milton Keynes Dons